Gaspar Juan Pérez de Guzmán y Guzmán, 10th Duke of Medina Sidonia (1630–1667) was Duke of Medina Sidonia from 1664 to 1667.  He married Antonia, daughter of Luis Méndez de Haro, 6th Marquis of Carpio.  He died without issue, and the title passed to his younger half brother.

1630 births
1667 deaths
Dukes of Medina Sidonia